Nephelium hypoleucum, the korlan, is a tree in the family Sapindaceae. It is in the same genus as the rambutan and also closely related to several other tropical fruits including the lychee, longan, and guinep.

The fruit is a round to oval drupe borne in a loose pendant cluster.

External links
 Sorting Nephelium names

hypoleucum
Tropical fruit